Chilswell is a small settlement in the parish of Cumnor, Oxfordshire.  It lies between the village of South Hinksey and Boars Hill. In 1974 it was transferred from Berkshire.

The place was first mentioned in 1180 as Chiefleswelle.  The name is of Old English origin, and appears to mean 'the stream of a man called Cifel'.  An older form of the name is Childsworth, and the place is mentioned by that name in the poem Thyrsis by Matthew Arnold.  Arnold's "signal elm" is in a field nearby, bought by the Oxford Preservation Trust from All Souls College, Oxford in 2009.

The remains of a Roman villa have been found nearby.

Chilswell House, on the edge of Boars Hill, was built in 1907 to be the home of the poet Robert Bridges, the writer Monica Bridges and their three children.

Chilswell Valley (also known as Happy Valley), between Chilswell and South Hinksey, is a nature reserve managed by Oxford City Council.

References

Hamlets in Oxfordshire